Kaala may refer to:

Kaala, Guinea
Ka'ala, the highest peak on the island of Oahu, Hawaii
Kaala (2017 film), a 2017 Sinhalese film directed by Sujeewa Gunarathne starring Mahendra Perera
Kaala (2018 film), a 2018 Indian Tamil film directed by Pa. Ranjith starring Rajinikanth